Mesonerilla is a genus of polychaetes in the Nerillidae family. 
It contains the following species:
 Mesonerilla armoricana Swedmark, 1959
 Mesonerilla biantennata Jouin, 1963
 Mesonerilla fagei Swedmark, 1959
 Mesonerilla intermedia Wilke, 1953
 Mesonerilla luederitzi Remane, 1949
 Mesonerilla prospera Sterrer & Iliffe, 1982
 Mesonerilla roscovita Levi, 1953

References

Polychaete genera
Taxonomy articles created by Polbot